Benjamin Putnam Calhoun (1855 - 1907) was an American lawyer and politician.

He was born in St. Augustine, Florida. He was a one term state legislator who served on the South Carolina House of Representatives. A Democrat, he served as one of five representatives for Orangeburg, South Carolina. Benjamin K. Randolph was state senator for the area.

His wife died a year after he did on July 26, 1908. An 1886 Bar Association of New Mexico meeting report identified him as living in Grants, New Mexico.

References

1855 births
1907 deaths
19th-century American politicians
Democratic Party members of the South Carolina House of Representatives
19th-century American lawyers
People from St. Augustine, Florida
People from Orangeburg, South Carolina